ASPA may refer to:
Allocation de Solidarité aux Personnes Agées
American Service-Members' Protection Act
American Society for Public Administration
American Samoa Power Authority
Animals (Scientific Procedures) Act 1986
Antarctic Specially Protected Area
Aotearoa Student Press Association
 ASPA (car), a 1920s Czech car
ASPA (gene), Aspartoacylase, on human chromosome 17
Summit of South American-Arab Countries

See also
Aspa (disambiguation)